Sotolongo is a surname. Notable people with the surname include:

Marcelino Miyares Sotolongo (born 1937), Cuban-American marketing executive and political leader
Roniel Iglesias Sotolongo (born 1988), Cuban amateur boxer